Buzinovka is a rural locality (a khutor) and the administrative center of Buzinovskoye Rural Settlement, Kalachyovsky District, Volgograd Oblast, Russia. The population was 645 as of 2010. There are 9 streets.

Geography 
Buzinovka is located in steppe, on Yergeni, 51 km southeast of Kalach-na-Donu (the district's administrative centre) by road. Yarki-Rubezhny is the nearest rural locality.

References 

Rural localities in Kalachyovsky District
Don Host Oblast